Aarne Johannes Nuorvala (18 April 1912, Viipuri – 11 July 2013, Helsinki) was a Finnish official, and a nonpartisan minister, and deputy prime minister, in the Lehto Cabinet 1963-1964.

He worked in the Supreme Administrative Court of Finland 1957-1964, and as the Chancellor of Justice 1964-1965. Then he was appointed as the President of Supreme Administrative Court of Finland. He retired in 1982.

References 

1912 births
2013 deaths
20th-century Finnish judges
Deputy Prime Ministers of Finland
Chancellors of Justice of Finland
Finnish centenarians
Men centenarians